Kappa Leonis, Latinized from κ Leonis, is a double star in the constellation Leo. It was called Al-minħar al-asad, meaning the Lion's nose. The name is corrupted as Al Minliar al Asad in the Yale Bright Star Catalogue. This star is visible to the naked eye with an apparent visual magnitude of 4.46. It has an annual parallax shift of 16.20 mas as seen from Earth, which provides a distance estimate of about 201 light years. Kappa Leonis is moving away from the Sun with a radial velocity of +28 km/s.

The primary component is an evolved K-type giant star with a stellar classification of K2 III. It is about the same age as the Sun with an estimated 144% of the Sun's mass and has expanded to 17 times the Sun's girth. It is radiating 89 times the luminosity of the Sun from its enlarged photosphere at an effective temperature of 4,400 K.

Kappa Leonis has a magnitude 10.4 companion at an angular separation of 2.1 arc seconds. The pair most likely form a binary star system.  The companion is a suspected variable star.

References

K-type giants
Al Minliar al Asad
Leonis, Kappa
Leo (constellation)
Durchmusterung objects
Leonis, 01
081146
046146
3731